Luís Fróis (1532 – 8 July 1597) was a Portuguese missionary who worked in Asia during the second half of the 16th century.  While in Japan in 1582, he witnessed the attack on Honnō-ji, a Buddhist temple that ended in the death of Oda Nobunaga.

Biography
Fróis was born in Lisbon in 1532. He was educated in King Joao's court, where a close relative served as a scribe. At an early age, he started working for the Royal Secretary's office. In 1548, he joined the Jesuits traveling to Portuguese India to study at Saint Paul's College, Goa. He arrived in Goa on September 4, 1548. One of his teachers described Fróis' character as tough and good natured but not religious.

During his stay in Goa, Fróis reported on the mass conversion of over 200 Kshatriyas to Christianity that had taken place on 25 August 1560 in the village of Batim, in a letter dated 13 November 1560:

Fróis became a priest and confessor in 1561 after completing his theological studies in Goa. A year later, he was sent to Japan along with Giovanni Battista de Monte to engage in missionary work. On June 6, 1563 - after spending several months in Macau - he arrived in Yokoseura, Japan. The following year, he travelled to Kyoto, where he met Ashikaga Yoshiteru who was then shōgun. In 1569, he befriended Oda Nobunaga and stayed in his personal residence in Gifu while writing books for a short while. His works on history were somewhat expanded by Joāo Rodrigues. Among his works was the Treatise (1585) in which is contained some brief comparisons of the behaviors between the peoples of Europe and that province of Japan (Tratado em que se contêm muito sucinta e abreviadamente algumas contradições e diferenças de costumes entre a gente de Europa e esta província de Japão). 

Fróis wrote a book about the history and custom of Japan, titled Historia de Iapam. In it he gave details about the Jesuit mission in Japan and its most important figures. He described the destruction of Buddhist and Shinto temples as victories over the devil and that Jesuits like Gaspar Coelho encouraged the destruction despite resistance from Japanese Christian nobles.

In 1582, Frois witnessed the end of Nobunaga from his church across the street from Honno-ji.  He wrote an account of what he saw afterward.

Cultural references
He was portrayed by Terry O'Brien in the Japanese TV series Hideyoshi. A fictionalized version of Luis Frois appears in the Capcom game Onimusha: Dawn of Dreams.

See also
Francis Xavier
Gaspar Vilela
Francisco Cabral
Alessandro Valignano
List of Westerners who visited Japan before 1868

References

1532 births
1597 deaths
Clergy from Lisbon
16th-century Portuguese Jesuits
Portuguese Roman Catholic missionaries
Roman Catholic missionaries in Japan
Jesuit missionaries in Japan
Portuguese male writers
Japanologists
16th-century Portuguese writers
Portuguese Renaissance writers
Portuguese travel writers
Portuguese expatriates in Japan